The Burt County State Bank is a historic building in Tekamah, Nebraska. It was built in 1884, and designed in the Commercial style. The first floor housed the Burt County State Bank, run by H. M. Hopewell and Wellington Harington, and the second floor housed law firm offices. It has been listed on the National Register of Historic Places since March 4, 2009.

References

External links

		
National Register of Historic Places in Burt County, Nebraska
Early Commercial architecture in the United States
Buildings and structures completed in 1884